Aira Marketta Kokkonen (born 1946) was City Manager/Mayor of Espoo, the second largest city in Finland, from 1995 to 2010.

References 

Living people
1946 births
Mayors of places in Finland
People from Espoo
Women mayors of places in Finland